Parkside is a neighborhood in the West Philadelphia section of Philadelphia, Pennsylvania, USA. 
Much of the Parkside neighborhood was built during the 1876 Centennial Exhibition. It is a National Register of Historic Places Historic District with many examples of Victorian architecture, some well-preserved, others in poor condition. The neighborhood was populated by German Americans, followed by Eastern European Jews, before becoming heavily African American after World War II. (Directly after World War II it was home to many displaced persons from Eastern Europe, which included Latvians.)

In 2008, a shopping mall called the Park West Town Village Shopping Center was completed. Its anchor stores are Shop Rite, Lowe's, McDonald's, and CW Price. It is located on North 52nd Street.

Parkside is the home of the Evans Recreation Center. In 2014, the Philly Pumptrack opened at Evans.

Parkside was the early home of gangsta rapper Schoolly D, and was referenced in his songs "PSK" (Park Side Killers) and "Parkside 5-2".

External links
Parkside Historic Preservation Corporation 
East Parkside Community Revitalization Corporation
Parkside Association Of Philadelphia  (PAP)

References

Neighborhoods in Philadelphia
National Register of Historic Places in Philadelphia
Houses on the National Register of Historic Places in Philadelphia
Houses completed in 1876
Philadelphia Register of Historic Places
West Philadelphia
Houses in Philadelphia
Historic districts on the National Register of Historic Places in Pennsylvania